A fixer is someone who carries out assignments for or is skillful at solving problems for others. The term has different meanings in different contexts. In British usage the term is neutral, meaning "the sort of person who solves problems and gets things done". In journalism, a fixer is a local person who expedites the work of a correspondent working in a foreign country. Use in American English implies that methods used to conceal their clients' identities or potential scandals are almost certainly of questionable morality, if not legality. A fixer who disposes of bodies or "cleans up" physical evidence of crime is often more specifically called a cleaner. In sports, the term describes someone who makes (usually illegal) arrangements to manipulate or pre-arrange the outcome of a sporting contest.

Facilitator 
Fixers may primarily use legal means, such as lawsuits and payoffs, to accomplish their ends, or they may carry out unlawful activities. The White House Plumbers have been described as fixers for Richard Nixon; their methods included break-ins and burglary. Fixers who specialize in disposing of evidence or bodies are called "cleaners", like the character of Victor "The Cleaner" in the film La Femme Nikita, or the fictional Jonathan Quinn, subject of the Brett Battles novel The Cleaner.

In Britain, a fixer is a commercial consultant for business improvement, whereas in an American context a fixer is often an associate of a powerful person who carries out difficult, undercover, or stealth actions, or extricates a client out of personal or legal trouble. A fixer may freelance, like Judy Smith, a well-known American public relations "crisis consultant" whose career provided inspiration for the popular 2012 television series Scandal. More commonly a fixer works for a single employer, under a title such as "attorney" or "bodyguard", which does not typically describe the kinds of services that they provide.

Sports match fixer 

In sport, when a match fixer arranges a preordained outcome of a sporting or athletic contest, the motivation is often gambling, and the fixer is often employed by organized crime. In the Black Sox Scandal, for instance, Major League Baseball players became involved with a gambling syndicate and agreed to lose the 1919 World Series in exchange for payoffs. In another example, in 1975, Boston mobster Anthony "Fat Tony" Ciulla of the Winter Hill Gang was identified as the fixer who routinely bribed jockeys to throw horse races. Other insiders may also be fixers, as in the case of veterinarian Mark Gerard, who, in September 1978, was convicted of fraud for "masterminding a horse-racing scandal that involved switching two thoroughbreds" so that he could cash in on a long-shot bet.

Journalism aide 
In journalism, a fixer is someone, often a local journalist, hired by a foreign correspondent or a media company to help arrange a story. Fixers will most often act as translators and guides, and will help to arrange local interviews that the correspondent would not otherwise have access to. They help to collect information for the story and sometimes play a crucial role in the outcome. Fixers are rarely credited, and often put themselves in danger, especially in regimes where they might face consequences from an oppressive government for exposing iniquities the state may want to censor.

In modern journalism, these aides are often the prime risk mitigators within a journalist's team, making crucial decisions for the reporter. According to journalist Laurie Few, "You don't have time not to listen (to the fixer)", and anybody who disregards a fixer's advice "is going to step on a landmine, figurative or actual". Throughout the last 20 years, fixers have ranged from civilians to local journalists within the regions of conflict. They are rarely credited and paid menially, which has begun a conversation for the compensation rights of these individuals. According to statistics gathered from the Global Investigative Journalism Network, the base pay for a fixer's time ranged from US$50–400 per day.

A map based on publicly accessible research data shows a visual representation of data collected from various studies conducted on both fixers and their journalist counterparts from over 70 countries. Gathered from the Global Reporting Centre, the survey demographic map had 132 respondents from North America, 101 from Europe, 23 from South America, Africa and Eurasia, 63 from Asia and 9 from Australia.

In popular culture 

Numerous films and several songs have been named The Fixer, and, as a genre, illustrate the different meanings of the term. Most commonly, they refer to the kind of person who carries out illicit activities on behalf of someone else. For example, the 2008 British television series The Fixer is about "a renegade group acting outside the law to bring order to the spiraling criminal activity in the country".

 The 1986 film Wise Guys features Captain Lou Albano as Frankie "The Fixer" Acavano, an overweight, violent yet gluttonous psychopath who is tasked with tracking and killing the protagonists after ripping their boss, Lou Castello off of a quarter of a million dollars in a fixed horse race.
 The 1993 film Point of No Return features Harvey Keitel as a cleaner who is called in to kill everyone and destroy the bodies after a mission goes awry.
 The 1994 film Pulp Fiction features Harvey Keitel as Winston Wolfe, a notorious fixer and cleaner, who helps the protagonists dispose of a corpse.
 The main antagonist of the 2000 novel Void Moon is a near-psychotic fixer who cleans and investigates a murder in his employer's casino.
 A BBC Two documentary Alex Polizzi: The Fixer features a fixer in the benign British sense – a consultant who helps to turn around failing businesses.
 The 2000 crime picture The Way of the Gun has James Caan as a fixer known as Joe Sarno, a "Bagman".
 The 2007 film Michael Clayton stars George Clooney as a fixer who works for a prestigious law firm and uses his connections and knowledge of legal loopholes to help his clients.
 The 2007 gangster film Eastern Promises has Viggo Mortensen playing Nikolai Luzhin, a Russian mafia fixer, bodyguard and driver. 
 In Canadian writer Linden MacIntyre's award-winning 2009 novel The Bishop's Man, the protagonist is a guilt-ridden Roman Catholic priest and former fixer for the Diocese of Antigonish named Fr. Duncan MacAskill. After years of quietly resolving potential scandals involving the misdeeds of Diocesan priests, Fr. MacAskill has been assigned by his Bishop to a remote rural parish on Cape Breton Island, Nova Scotia, and ordered to maintain a low profile. While at his new parish, Fr. MacAskill begins spiritually counselling the son of a childhood friend, who suspects that his son was molested by the previous parish priest. Deeply moved by the boy's pain, Fr. MacAskill begins to seriously question his own past and the morality of acting as a fixer of such cases. MacIntyre's novel was inspired by the 2007 sexual abuse scandal in Antigonish diocese. 
 In the ABC drama Scandal, the main character Olivia Pope (portrayed by Kerry Washington) was a fixer and head of Pope and Associates, a crisis management organization that fixed political scandals and cleaned up crimes. Kerry Washington's character, Olivia Pope, is partially based on former George H. W. Bush administration press aide Judy Smith, who serves as a co-executive producer.
 The Netflix series House of Cards featured Michael Kelly as Doug Stamper, a fixer for politician Frank Underwood.
 In the AMC TV series Breaking Bad, the character Mike Ehrmantraut played by Jonathan Banks was the cleaner for Gustavo Fring's operations, later reprising the role in the series' prequel spinoff, Better Call Saul.
 The TV series Ray Donovan follows the eponymous character, played by Liev Schrieber, a Los Angeles-based fixer for celebrity clients. The character was inspired by a variety of Hollywood fixers such as Eddie Mannix and Fred Otash.
 The 2016 Coen brothers' film Hail, Caesar!, satirizes the American film industry of the 1950s, and is very loosely inspired by Eddie Mannix's career as a Hollywood studio executive and fixer. In the film, actor Josh Brolin portrayed Mannix, who is shown scrambling to quietly resolve the kidnapping of an A-list leading man, while battling to keep multiple thinly fictionalized send-ups of real Hollywood scandals of the era out of the tabloids. Behind it all, however, Mannix depicted as a devout, if sinful and unconventional, Roman Catholic family man with two children and a doting homemaker wife named Connie Mannix (Alison Pill).
 The 2016 Romanian drama The Fixer and the 2009 documentary Fixer: The Taking of Ajmal Naqshbandi are each about journalistic fixers.
 In the 2020 television show Devs, security chief Kenton (Zach Grenier) serves as a fixer for the heads of the Amaya corporation.
 In the Ubisoft videogame Watch Dogs, enemy players are known as fixers, and players can get contracts to eliminate other players, or carry out illegal jobs in game.
 In several cyberpunk-themed tabletop role-playing games such as Shadowrun and Mike Pondsmith's Cyberpunk, fixers are intermediaries between clients and mercenaries, "well-connected fencers, smugglers, and information brokers who apply their trade on the black market," connecting mercenaries to jobs they prefer to take and other mercenaries in the network they can work with.

Notable fixers

Business
 Alex Polizzi

Entertainment
 Eddie Mannix
 Fred Otash
 Anthony Pellicano
 Howard Strickling

Journalism
 Acquitté Kisembe – Agence France-Presse in the Democratic Republic of Congo (missing since 2003)
 Almigdad Mojalli – Independent freelance fixer/journalist in Yemen (killed in action, 2016)
 Bakhtiyar Haddad - Iraqi fixer for French reporter Stephan Villeneuve (Both killed in action in Mosul, 2014)
 Zabihullah Tamanna – Translator for US National Public Radio in Afghanistan (killed in action, 2016)
 Ajmal Naqshbandi - Journalist/Fixer in Afghanistan. Killed by Taliban. (Killed in action, 2011)
 Sayed Agha - Driver/fixer in Afghanistan. Killed by Taliban. (Killed in action, 2011)

Organized crime
 Sidney Korshak (Chicago Outfit)
 Arnold Rothstein (Jewish Mafia)
 Yoshio Kodama (Yakuza)
 Hisayuki Machii (Yakuza - Tosei-kai)
 John Francis "Johnny Cash" Morrissey (Irish Mafia - Kinahan crime family)

Politics and business
 Lucius Cornelius Balbus
 Roy Cohn
 Konstantin Kilimnik
 Keith Schiller

Public relations
 Mike Sitrick
 Judy Smith

Religion
 Seán Patrick O'Malley, Archbishop of Boston (Catholic Church)
 Mike Rinder (Scientology Church)

See also 
 Cleaner role in arts and entertainment
 Henchman
 Hitman
 Contract killing

References 

Ethically disputed political practices
Journalism terminology
Match fixing
Organized crime activity
Political corruption